The 2012 Nottingham Challenge (known for sponsorship reasons as the Aegon Nottingham Challenge) was a professional tennis tournament played on grass courts. It was the second edition of the tournament which was part of the 2012 ATP Challenger Tour and the 2012 ITF Women's Circuit. It took place in Nottingham, Great Britain between 11 and 17 June 2012.

ATP entrants

Seeds

 1 Rankings are as of May 28, 2012.

Other entrants
The following players received wildcards into the singles main draw:
  Luke Bambridge
  Edward Corrie
  Kyle Edmund
  Joshua Goodall

The following players received entry as a special exempt into the singles main draw:
  Robert Kendrick

The following players received entry from the qualifying draw:
  Richard Bloomfield
  Stéphane Bohli
  Adrien Bossel
  Aliaksandr Bury

WTA entrants

Seeds

 1 Rankings are as of May 28, 2012.

Other entrants
The following players received wildcards into the singles main draw:
  Katy Dunne
  Anna Fitzpatrick
  Jade Windley
  Lisa Whybourn

The following players received entry from the qualifying draw:
  Çağla Büyükakçay
  Maria João Koehler
  Conny Perrin
  Marta Sirotkina

The following players received entry by a Junior Exempt:
  Ashleigh Barty

Champions

Men's singles

 Grega Žemlja def.  Karol Beck, 7–6(7–3), 4–6, 6–4

Men's doubles

 Olivier Charroin /  Martin Fischer def.  Evgeny Donskoy /  Andrey Kuznetsov, 6–4, 7–6(8–6)

Women's singles

 Ashleigh Barty def.  Tatjana Malek, 6–1, 6–1

Women's doubles

 Ashleigh Barty /  Sally Peers def.  Réka-Luca Jani /  Maria João Koehler, 7–6(7–2), 3–6, [10–5]

External links
Official website
LTA website

Nottingham Challenge
Nottingham Challenge
Nottingham Challenge
Nottingham Challenge
2010s in Nottingham
2012 in English tennis